Antoniou (Greek: Αντωνίου) is a Greek surname. It derived from the Antonius root name. Notable examples include:

Men 
Kostas Antoniou (born 1962), Greek footballer.
Marios Antoniou (born 1980), Greek footballer.
Platon Antoniou (born 1968), English-Greek photographer.
Theodore Antoniou (1935-2018), Greek conductor and composer.
Haris Antoniou (born 1989), Greek-Cypriot singer and musician.

Women 
Angeliki Antoniou (born 1956), Greek director and screenwriter
Laura Antoniou (born 1963), American novelist
Ria Antoniou (born 1988), Greek model

See also 
 Papantoniou

References

Greek-language surnames
Surnames
Patronymic surnames
Surnames from given names